The 2023 Lamar Hunt U.S. Open Cup will be the 108th edition of the oldest soccer tournament in the United States. The tournament proper will feature both professional and amateur teams in the United States soccer league system.

Qualification for the 2023 tournament includes local qualifying matches contested by 107 amateur teams scheduled to take place in 2022.  One team also qualified by winning the 2022 National Amateur Cup. Clubs playing in fully professional leagues may enter the tournament proper and bypass the qualification process.

Qualification procedures 
The United States Soccer Federation's (U.S. Soccer) Open Cup Committee manages both the tournament proper and the local qualification process.

Clubs based in the United States that play in a league that is an organization member of U.S. Soccer are generally eligible to compete for the U.S. Open Cup, if their league includes at least four teams and has a schedule of at least 10 matches for each club.

U.S.-based teams in Division I, II and III professional leagues qualify for the U.S. Open Cup automatically, provided they are eligible. To be eligible, these teams must be members in good standing of their leagues on December 31, 2021, and remain so through the 2023 U.S. Open Cup Final. The league must have been in operation prior to the open division entry deadline and remain in operation through the 2023 U.S. Open Cup Final. A new Division I, II or III professional league must have its match schedule announced to the public by January 31, 2022, and the first match must be scheduled for no later than seven days before the first scheduled round of the U.S. Open Cup tournament proper that involves the team's division. If a new club joins an existing Division I, II or III league, the league must meet the aforementioned criteria applicable to new leagues in order for the new club to be eligible for the U.S. Open Cup.

A professional team that is majority owned by a higher-level professional team or whose player roster is materially managed by a higher-level professional team is ineligible to participate in the U.S. Open Cup.

Clubs that are below Division III are Open Division teams. To be eligible for the 2023 U.S. Open Cup, an Open Division team must remain a playing member in good standing within its competition from the Open Division Entry Deadline through the final of the 2023 U.S. Open Cup . The league must have been in operation since no later than the open Division Entry Deadline, and remain so until the 2023 U.S. Open Cup Final. A team that started its first season of competition in an existing league must have started its new league's schedule no later than Open Division Entry Deadline.

Starting in 2019, the winner of the previous year's National Amateur Cup automatically qualifies for the U.S. Open Cup. The cup winner enters the tournament proper in the first round with the other Open Division clubs.

National leagues may elect to use the results of their previous year's seasons to determine which of their teams qualify for the U.S. Open Cup in lieu of having their teams play local qualifying matches. If a national league so elects, its teams are not eligible to participate in local qualifying. To qualify as a national league, the league must

 Have a minimum of 50 active U.S.-based teams in good standing,
 Have a common championship each season that is only available to league teams and is compulsory,
 Use a league format with a standings table as opposed to a single-elimination (knockout) format,
 Have teams in at least three U.S. time zones among Eastern, Central, Mountain and Pacific, with the three time zones containing the most teams each having at least 15% of the member teams,
 Have two time zones represented by at least three different U.S. states or the District of Columbia and a third time zone represented by at least two different U.S. states or the District of Columbia,
 Have teams in at least 10 different U.S. states or the District of Columbia,
 Timely pay the team-based Open Cup entry fee for all teams in the league.
 Must have operated over the last 12-month period and over the next 12-month period in compliance with this criteria.

Eligible Open Division clubs that did not win the National Amateur Cup and are not members of national leagues must have submitted an application to enter local qualifying by August 8, 2022.

Once applications for local qualifying are approved, U.S. Soccer preliminary estimates of the number of Open Division teams needed in the U.S. Open Cup, based on the anticipated participation of professional teams and anticipated structure of the tournament bracket. One of these slots is allocated to the National Amateur Cup champions. The remainder are allocated among the pool of local qualification teams and the national leagues, based on the relative number of teams in each, resulting in a target number of local qualifiers. The Commissioner will establish the number of qualifying rounds needed to achieve the number of surviving local qualifying teams after the target number of First Round slots is determined. The Commissioner will attempt to minimize the number of byes in order to ensure teams that advance to the First Round have played the same number of games. Byes are distributed randomly and are meant to avoid unnecessary travel but are kept to a minimum to preserve the integrity of the qualification tournament. Once the qualification tournament format has been finalized, the number of local qualifiers becomes fixed, unless a team that qualifies later becomes ineligible. After the December 31, 2021 professional clubs entry application deadline, the final number of Open Division teams needed in the 2022 U.S. Open Cup will become known. From this number, the fixed number of local qualifiers plus one for the National Amateur Cup champion are subtracted to determine the number of slots for clubs from the national leagues. These slots are allocated among the leagues based on their relative numbers of U.S. based eligible teams.

National Amateur Cup 
Milwaukee Bavarian SC defeated Northern Virginia FC, 1–0, to win the 2022 National Amateur Cup and qualify for the 2023 U.S. Open Cup.

Local qualifying 
U.S. Soccer originally announced that 107 teams would participate in local qualifying. Four rounds of local qualifying matches will result in 9 clubs advancing to the tournament proper. Local qualifying will be competed in a single-game, knockout format and match-ups will be organized geographically to minimize travel time and expenses. Random selection will be used to determine matchups when possible and coin flips will determine home teams.

Schedule

Number of teams by state and league
A total of 25 states and the District of Columbia are represented by clubs in the U.S. Open Cup Qualification this year.

 States without a team in the Open Cup Qualification: Alaska, Arkansas, Delaware, Hawaii, Idaho, Iowa, Louisiana, Kansas, Maine, Michigan, Minnesota, Mississippi, Missouri, Montana, Nebraska, North Dakota, Oklahoma, Oregon, Rhode Island, South Dakota, Utah, Vermont, West Virginia, Wisconsin and Wyoming.

First qualifying round 
The first qualifying round matches were scheduled to be played on September 17 and 18. Twenty-three East and Fifteen West Region Teams teams were given byes into the Second Qualifying Round

East region 

 Byes: 1927 SC (Ind.), Beaman United FC (Tenn.), Bowling Green FC (Ky.), Brockton FC United (Mass.), Chicago House AC (Ill.), Christos FC (Md.), FC Birmingham (Ala.), Gainesville City FC (Fla.), Hurricane FC (Fla.), IASC Boom (N.Y.), Kalonji Pro-Profile (Ga.), Metro Louisville FC (Ky.), Mint Hill FC (N.C.), Naples City FC (Fla.), Naples United FC (Fla.), Orlando FC Wolves (Fla.), Sahara Gunners FC (N.Y.), Santa Cruz FC (Mass.), South Carolina United Heat (S.C.), TCSA (Ga.), Tobacco Road FC (N.C.), Unations FC (Mass.), Valhalla FC (Ohio)

West region 

 Byes: Alamo City Soccer Club (Texas), BattleBorn FC (Nev.), Bellevue Athletic FC (Wash.), Boulder United FC (Colo.), Coronado Athletic Club (Ariz.), D10 Lions FC (Texas), Desert FC (Calif.), Elk Grove Blues (Calif.), Legend Football Gold (Wash.), Modesto City Football Club (Calif.), Olympians FC (Ariz.), Real San Jose (Calif.), Temecula FC (Calif.), UDA Soccer (N.M.)

Second qualifying round 
The second qualifying round matches were scheduled to be played on October 15 & 16.

East region

West region

Third qualifying round 
The third qualifying round matches were scheduled to be played on November 19 & 20.

East region

West region

Fourth qualifying round 
The fourth qualifying round matches are scheduled to be played on December 17 & 18. The nine winners of this round will advance to the First Round of the tournament proper in March 2023

References

Qualification
2022 in American soccer
2023 in American soccer